Bita (بیتا) is a female name of Persian origin meaning unique.

Notes

External links
 Bita in Persian Baby Names

Feminine given names
Persian feminine given names